Elliott House or Elliot House may refer to:

 in New Zealand 
Elliott House, Wellington, a historic building in Wellington, New Zealand

in the United States (by state then city)
John W. Elliott House, Eutaw, Alabama
S. T. Elliott House, Kingman, Arizona
 Elliott House (Tempe, Arizona), listed on the National Register of Historic Places
 Elliott House (Bentonville, Arkansas), listed on the National Register of Historic Places
Elliott-Meek House, Camden, Arkansas
Elliott House (Fordyce, Arkansas)
James Elliott Farm, New Harmony, Indiana
Charles D. Elliott House, Newton, Massachusetts
Luther Elliott House, Reading, Massachusetts
Eliot House (South Hadley, Massachusetts), at Mount Holyoke College
Elliott House B & B, Beulah, Michigan
Elliott-Donaldson House, Okolona, Mississippi, listed on the National Register of Historic Places
T. S. Eliot House, St. Louis, Missouri
Dr. Samuel MacKenzie Elliott House, New York, New York
Elliot-Powers House and Garage, Fargo, North Dakota
Elliott House (Indian Hill, Ohio)
Elliott House (Portland, Oregon)
Marion Reed Elliott House, Prineville, Oregon
Elliott House (Richburg, South Carolina)
Thornwell-Elliott House, Fort Mill, South Carolina
Joel Elliott House, Belton, Texas, listed on the National Register of Historic Places
Johnson-Elliott House, Fort Worth, Texas, listed on the National Register of Historic Places
E. Clyde and Mary Elliott House, Wharton, Texas, listed on the National Register of Historic Places
Dicks-Elliott House, Lynchburg, Virginia
Small-Elliott House, Walla Walla, Washington, listed on the National Register of Historic Places
Edward C. Elliott House, Madison, Wisconsin, listed on the National Register of Historic Places